The 13th Sarasaviya Awards festival (Sinhala: 13වැනි සරසවිය සම්මාන උලෙළ), presented by the Associated Newspapers of Ceylon Limited, was held to honor the best films of 1984 Sinhala cinema on July 20, 1985, at the Bandaranaike Memorial International Conference Hall, Colombo 07, Sri Lanka. First Lady of Sri Lanka Hema Premadasa was the chief guest at the awards night.

The film Sasara Chethana won the most awards with seven.

Awards

References

Sarasaviya Awards
Sarasaviya